James Wyley Sessions (December 11, 1885 – April 21, 1977) was an American religious leader who was the first Institute of Religion director in the Church of Jesus Christ of Latter-day Saints (LDS Church).

Early life 
Sessions was born in Cassia County, Idaho Territory.

Career
He was sent in 1926 by church president Heber J. Grant to head the Institute of Religion in Moscow, Idaho. Sessions later served as the head of the church's mission home in Salt Lake City, Utah for many years.

In 1921, Sessions became the president of the LDS Church's South African Mission, succeeding Nicholas G. Smith. Sessions continued in this position until 1926, when he returned to Utah and almost immediately was sent to direct the institute in Idaho. Over the next decade, Sessions set up Institutes of Religion at several universities in the western United States. He believed that institutes should offer strong academic classes, social interaction, and be housed in permanent and respectable buildings. In 1935, Sessions was serving as the institute director in Pocatello, Idaho.

From 1939 to 1947, Sessions was the head of the Division of Religion at Brigham Young University in Provo, Utah.

Death 
Sessions died in Los Angeles in 1977.

References

Further reading
Garr, Arnold K., Donald Q. Cannon and Richard O. Cowan, ed., Encyclopedia of Latter-day Saint History, pp. 541, 1090.
Casey Paul Griffiths, "The First Institute Teacher," Religious Educator, Vol. 11, No. 2, (2010).

1885 births
1977 deaths
American leaders of the Church of Jesus Christ of Latter-day Saints
American Mormon missionaries in the United States
Brigham Young University faculty
Church Educational System instructors
Mission presidents (LDS Church)
American Mormon missionaries in South Africa
20th-century Mormon missionaries
Latter Day Saints from Utah
Latter Day Saints from Idaho